Deh-e Viran (also Romanized as Deh-e Vīrān and Deh Vīrān) is a village in Sarduiyeh Rural District, Sarduiyeh District, Jiroft County, Kerman Province, Iran. At the 2006 census, its population was 96, in 21 families.

References 

Populated places in Jiroft County